The Italian PGA Championship is a golf tournament organised by the Professional Golfers' Association of Italy. It was first played in 1977.

The 2016 event, the 40th Championship, was won by Andrea Rota who beat Matteo Delpodio in a playoff.

Winners

Source

References

Golf tournaments in Italy
Recurring sporting events established in 1977
1977 establishments in Italy